César René Cuenca (born January 18, 1981) is an Argentine professional boxer who held the IBF light welterweight title from 2015 to 2016.

Professional career
On March 20, 2009 Cuenca won a twelve-round unanimous decision against undefeated contender Alex de Jesús.

On May 3, 2014 Cuenca defeated Albert Mensah to become the mandatory challenger for the IBF junior welterweight belt, held by American Lamont Peterson.

On July 18, 2015 he defeated Ik Yang in Macau by unanimous decision, in a bout he dominated and dropped his opponent, despite being knocked down himself. In the process, he won the vacant IBF light welterweight world championship, after a thirteen-year career, that spanned 49 fights prior, including two 'no contests'.

Cuenca lost his world title in his next fight on November 4, 2015 when he faced Eduard Troyanovsky in Kazan, Russia. Cuenca, who was 48-0 at the time of the fight, was unable to get in range for the majority of the boxing match. Troyanovsky had re-hydrated much more than Cuenca and he seemed bigger in the ring, he used his size advantage well. After five rounds Cuenca had won just one, in a close fight, his left eye was cut open. In the sixth round, Troyanovsky landed a hard uppercut and Cuenca grabbed him at the waist, Troyanovsky leaned on the Argentine and he tumbled down, then as Troyanovsky was moving away it is possible that his foot hit Cuenca in his right eye. Immediately afterwards the American referee asked Cuenca if he could continue fighting, to which Cuenca told him in Spanish that his right eye was injured from the tumble and he needed time to recover, but the referee (who could not understand Spanish) asked him again more sternly and Cuenca repeated himself, gesturing to his right eye. The referee then waved off the fight, to the displeasure of Cuenca and his corner.

Professional boxing record

References

External links

|-

Living people
1981 births
Argentine male boxers
Light-welterweight boxers
Southpaw boxers
International Boxing Federation champions
World light-welterweight boxing champions